The 1922 Washington State Cougars football team represented Washington State College (renamed Washington State University in 1959) in the Pacific Coast Conference (PCC) during the 1922 college football season. In its fourth and final season under head coach Gus Welch, the team compiled a 2–5 record (1–5 against PCC opponents), finished in seventh place in the PCC, and was outscored by their opponents by a combined total of 163 to 44.

Washington State opened the season with a 10–7 victory over Gus Dorais' Gonzaga team with the victory being sealed on a last-minute field goal by quarterback Vernard Hickey. The team followed with an 18–9 victory over Idaho in a game played in Moscow. Washington State scored two touchdowns in the fourth quarter, including an interception by Hickey returned 20 yards for a touchdown, to secure the victory. After winning its first two games, the team failed to win another game, losing to Washington (13–16), co-national champion California (0–61), Oregon (0–13), Oregon Agricultural (0–16), and USC (3–41).

Ford Dunton, a tackle from Spokane, was unanimously chosen by his teammates as the team captain. At the end of the 1922 season, Dunton was selected by the United Press as a first-team player on the 1922 All-Pacific Coast football team.

On December 23, 1922, Gus Welch resigned his position after four years as the team's head coach. Criticism of the team's record was reported to be a factor for the resignation.

Schedule

References

Washington State
Washington State Cougars football seasons
Washington State Cougars football